Dmitri Aleksandrovich Shovgenov (born 10 April 1987) is a former Russian professional football player.

Club career
He made his Russian Football National League debut for FC Spartak Nizhny Novgorod on 3 September 2006 in a game against FC Dynamo Bryansk. That was his only season in the FNL.

External links
 

1987 births
People from Yagodninsky District
Living people
Russian footballers
Association football forwards
Association football midfielders
FC Armavir players
FC Spartak Nizhny Novgorod players
Sportspeople from Magadan Oblast